Newtonia could refer to:
 Newtonia, Cheshire, England
 Newtonia, Missouri, a town in Missouri, USA
 Newtonia (bird), a genus of vangas, passerine birds endemic to Madagascar
 Newtonia (plant), a genus of flowering plants in the family Fabaceae
 662 Newtonia, a minor planet

Genus disambiguation pages